Alejandro Delgado is a Venezuelan actor and producer. Delgado was born in Caracas, the capital of Venezuela. Soon after graduating from high school, he received a scholarship to the National Academy of Arts and Sciences for TV and Film, under the tutelage of Amalia Perez Diaz. After several years of work in the Venezuelan and Peruvian film industries, he moved to the United States. There, he met with two agents from the top talent agencies in Los Angeles, where he received supportive and positive responses. He signed with the Henderson Hogan Talent Agency, and shortly thereafter, landed the role of "Harold Marresh" in Return to Babylon, a black and white comedy feature film directed by Alex Canawati. The film also starred María Conchita Alonso. Meetings with top casting directors Marnie Saitta from CBS's The Young and the Restless and Christy Dooley from CBS's The Bold and the Beautiful, he was cast in The Bold and the Beautiful, playing the character of Martin Escobosa.

Filmography
Return to Babylon (2008) .... Harold Marresh
The Night Stalker (2002) (TV) .... Detective Garcia
The Bold and the Beautiful (1987) TV series .... Martin Escobosa (unknown episodes, 2000–2001)
Belleza y poder (USA: Spanish title)
Old Friends (2000) (credited as Alex Delgado) .... Pierre Duvan
Torbellino (1997) TV series .... Leonardo Moreno (1997)
Sirena (1993) TV series .... Juan Hundre
Maribel (1989) TV series .... Oswaldo Zapata
Rubí rebelde (1989) TV series .... Reynaldo Itturralde
Abigail (1988) TV series .... Freddy Avellaneda (unknown episodes)
Alma mía (1988) TV series .... Manuel
Old Friends (2000) (producer)

External links
 Official website

Living people
Year of birth missing (living people)
Male actors from Caracas
Venezuelan film producers
Venezuelan male film actors
Venezuelan male telenovela actors
Venezuelan male television actors